Facciolella is a genus of eels in the duckbill eel family Nettastomatidae.

Species
There are currently six recognized species in this genus:
 Facciolella castlei Parin & Karmovskaya, 1985
 Facciolella equatorialis (C. H. Gilbert, 1891) (Dogface witch eel)
 Facciolella gilbertii (Garman, 1899)
 Facciolella karreri Klausewitz, 1995
 Facciolella oxyrhyncha (Bellotti, 1883) (Facciola's sorcerer)
 Facciolella saurencheloides (D'Ancona, 1928)

References

Nettastomatidae